Year 1222 (MCCXXII) was a common year starting on Saturday (link will display the full calendar) of the Julian calendar.

Events 
 By place 

 Asia 
 The Ghurid dynasty capital of Firozkoh (in modern-day Afghanistan) is destroyed, by Mongol Emperor Ögedei Khan.

 Mesoamerica 

 Chiconquiauhtzin becomes Ruler of the City-state Azcapotzalco at the Valley of Mexico

 Europe 
 April 17 – Stephen Langton, Archbishop of Canterbury in England, opens a council at Osney Abbey, Oxford.
 May 9 – Synod of Oxford - The 1222 Christian Synod of Oxford passed anti-Semitic laws that forbade social interactions between Jews and Christians, placed a specific tithe on Jews and required them to wear an identifying badge.
 May 11 – 1222 Cyprus earthquake.
 August – After the death of John I of Sweden on March 10, 6-year-old Erik Eriksson is elected new King of Sweden (sometime between this time and July 1223).
 December 15 – The Golden Bull of 1222 is issued in Hungary, limiting the power of the monarchy over the nobility.
December 25 – The 1222 Brescia earthquake is so powerful that the inhabitants of Brescia leave their city en masse and camp outside so that falling buildings would not crush them, according to chronicler Salimbene de Adam.
 Livonian Crusade – The Danish fail in their attempt to conquer Saaremaa Island from the Estonians.
 Ottokar I of Bohemia reunites Bohemia and Moravia.
 The Cistercian convent in Alcobaça, Portugal, is completed.
 Approximate date – The Royal Standard of Scotland is adopted.
 Traditional date – The University of Padua is founded in Italy, by Frederick II, Holy Roman Emperor.

Births 
 February 16 – Nichiren, founder of Nichiren Buddhism (d. 1282)
 August 4 – Richard de Clare, 6th Earl of Gloucester, English soldier (d. 1262)
 Andrei II of Russia, Grand Prince of Vladimir (d. 1264)
 Queen Jeongsun (Wonjong) of Korea (d. 1237)

Deaths 
 February 1 – Alexios Megas Komnenos, first Emperor of Trebizond
 March 10 – Johan Sverkersson, king of Sweden since 1216 (b. 1201)
 June 23 – Constance of Aragon, Holy Roman Empress, queen consort of Hungary (b. 1179)
 August 2 – Raymond VI, Count of Toulouse (b. 1156)
 August 12 – Vladislaus III, Duke of Bohemia
 Theodore I Lascaris, founder of the Byzantine Empire of Nicaea

References